Androgen replacement therapy (ART), often referred to as testosterone replacement therapy (TRT), is a form of hormone therapy in which androgens, often testosterone, are supplemented or replaced. It typically involves the administration of testosterone through injections, skin creams, patches, gels, pills, or subcutaneous pellets. ART is often prescribed to counter the effects of male hypogonadism.

ART is also prescribed to lessen the effects or delay the onset of normal male aging. However, this is controversial and is the subject of ongoing clinical trials. As men enter middle age they may notice changes caused by a relative decline in testosterone: fewer erections, fatigue, thinning skin, declining muscle mass and strength, and/or more body fat. Dissatisfaction with these changes causes some middle age men to seek ART. Androgen deficiencies in women have also, as of 2001, been recognized as a medical disorder that can be treated with ART. As with men, symptoms associated with androgen deficiency are most prevalent with age, and androgen replacement therapy has been shown to help with symptoms of menopause.

Medical uses

Men
Androgen replacement is the classic treatment of hypogonadism.  It is also used in men who have lost the ability to produce androgens due to disease or its treatment.

Diabetes
The risks of diabetes and of testosterone deficiency in men over 45 (i.e., hypogonadism, specifically hypoandrogenism) are strongly correlated. Testosterone replacement therapies have been shown to improve blood glucose management. Still, "it is prudent not to start testosterone therapy in men with diabetes solely for the purpose of improving metabolic control if they show no signs and symptoms of hypogonadism."

Women
Androgen replacement is used in postmenopausal women: the indications are to increase sexual desire; and to prevent or treat osteoporosis. Other symptoms of androgen deficiency are similar in both sexes, such as muscle loss and physical fatigue. The androgens used for androgen replacement in women include testosterone (and esters), prasterone (dehydroepiandrosterone; DHEA) (and the ester prasterone enanthate), methyltestosterone, nandrolone decanoate, and tibolone, among others.

Adverse effects

The Food and Drug Administration (FDA) stated in 2015 that neither the benefits nor the safety of testosterone have been established for low testosterone levels due to aging. The FDA has required that testosterone labels include warning information about the possibility of an increased risk of heart attacks and stroke.

Heart disease
On January 31, 2014, reports of strokes, heart attacks, and deaths in men taking testosterone-replacement led the FDA to announce that it would be investigating this issue. The FDA's action followed three peer-reviewed studies of increased cardiovascular events and deaths. Due to an increased rate of adverse cardiovascular events compared to a placebo group, a randomized trial stopped early. Also, in November 2013, a study reported an increase in deaths and heart attacks in older men. Even after a correction was published, the "Androgen Study Group", a group with many members who have relationships with drug companies in the testosterone market, requested JAMA to retract the article as misleading due to substantial residual errors. Concerns have been raised that testosterone was being widely marketed without the benefit of data on efficacy and safety from large randomized controlled trials. As a result of the "potential for adverse cardiovascular outcomes", the FDA announced, in September 2014, a review of the appropriateness and safety of testosterone replacement therapy. However, when given to men with hypogonadism in the short- and medium-term, testosterone replacement therapy does not increase the risk of cardiovascular events (including strokes and heart attacks and other heart diseases). The long-term safety of the therapy is not known yet.

Other
Other significant adverse effects of testosterone supplementation include acceleration of pre-existing prostate cancer growth in individuals who have undergone androgen deprivation; increased hematocrit, which can require venipuncture in order to treat; and, exacerbation of sleep apnea. Adverse effects may also include minor side-effects such as acne and oily skin, as well as, significant hair loss and/or thinning of the hair, which may be prevented with 5-alpha reductase inhibitors ordinarily used for the treatment of benign prostatic hyperplasia, such as finasteride. Exogenous testosterone may also cause suppression of spermatogenesis, leading to, in some cases, infertility. It is recommended that physicians screen for prostate cancer with a digital rectal exam and prostate-specific antigen (PSA) level before starting therapy, and monitor PSA and hematocrit levels closely during therapy.

Some studies argue that ART increases the risk of prostate cancer, although the results are not conclusive.

Methods of administration
There are several artificial androgens, many of which are manipulations of the testosterone molecule referred to as anabolic-androgenic steroids. Androgen replacement is administered by patch, tablet, capsule, cream or gel; or depot injections given into fat or muscle.

Society and culture

MMA
UFC fighters used TRT until 2014 when the Nevada State Athletic Commission banned its use.

Regulation
As of September 2014, testosterone replacement therapy has been under review for appropriateness and safety by the Food and Drug Administration due to the "potential for adverse cardiovascular outcomes".

Frequency of use
In the United States usage increased from 0.5% in 2002 to 3.2% in 2013 and have since decreased to 1.7% in 2016.

A UK study in 2013 showed that prescriptions for testosterone replacement, particularly transdermal products, almost doubled between 2000 and 2010.

Research
Testosterone is being investigated as therapy for the following conditions:
 Erectile dysfunction
 Osteoporosis
 Diabetes mellitus
 Chronic heart failure
 Dementia, but the evidence base is small and the balance of benefit needs to be clarified
 Transgender hormone therapy for transgender men

See also 
 List of androgens/anabolic steroids available in the United States
 Androgen deficiency
 Masculinizing hormone therapy

References 

Endocrine procedures
Testosterone